Rovnyy Island or Arka Island is an island in Shelikhov Bay, Sea of Okhotsk.

Geography
Rovnyy Island is 2.2 km long and 1.4 km wide. It is located off the eastern coast of Penzhina Bay, separated from the continental shore by a 6.8 km wide sound. Administratively it belongs to the Kamchatka Krai.

History

American whaleships cruised for bowhead whales off the island from 1860 to 1889. They called it Umbrella Island.

References

Islands of the Sea of Okhotsk
Islands of the Russian Far East
Uninhabited islands of Russia